Hello Sister may refer to:
Hello Sister (1930 film), a film by Walter Lang
Hello, Sister! (1933 film), a film produced by Fox Film Corporation